Fábio Nascimento Pinto (born 9 October 1980) is a Brazilian footballer who plays as a forward.

Career statistics
Fábio Pinto played for several clubs in the Campeonato Brasileiro, including Sport Club Internacional, Grêmio Foot-Ball Porto Alegrense, Associação Desportiva São Caetano, Cruzeiro Esporte Clube and Guarani Futebol Clube. He also had a spell with Galatasaray S.K. in the Turkish Super Lig.

He played for Brazil at the 1997 FIFA U-17 World Championship in Egypt.

Honours

Club
Campeonato Gaúcho Juvenil: 1997
Campeonato Gaúcho Júnior: 1997
Copa São Paulo de Juniores: 1998
Campeonato Gaúcho: 2002
Campeonato Pernambucano: 2005

International
Brazil U-17
FIFA U-17 World Championship: 1997

Individual
Third-highest scorer at the 1997 FIFA U-17 World Championship

References

1980 births
Living people
Sportspeople from Santa Catarina (state)
Brazilian footballers
Cruzeiro Esporte Clube players
Associação Desportiva São Caetano players
Grêmio Foot-Ball Porto Alegrense players
Sport Club Internacional players
Coritiba Foot Ball Club players
Guarani FC players
La Liga players
Real Oviedo players
Galatasaray S.K. footballers
Pakhtakor Tashkent FK players
Uzbekistan Super League players
Brazilian expatriate footballers
Brazilian expatriate sportspeople in Turkey
Süper Lig players
Expatriate footballers in Turkey
Expatriate footballers in Spain
Expatriate footballers in Uzbekistan
Association football forwards